Roland Bernard "Bunny" Berigan (November 2, 1908 – June 2, 1942) was an American jazz trumpeter and bandleader who rose to fame during the swing era. His career and influence were shortened by alcoholism, and ended with his early demise at the age of 33 from cirrhosis. Although he composed some jazz instrumentals such as "Chicken and Waffles" and "Blues", Berigan was best known for his virtuoso jazz trumpeting. His 1937 classic recording "I Can't Get Started" was inducted into the Grammy Hall of Fame in 1975.

Early life and career
Berigan was born in Hilbert, Wisconsin, the son of William Patrick Berigan and Mary Catherine (Mayme) Schlitzberg, and raised in Fox Lake. Having learned the violin and trumpet, Berigan started his career playing with local bands as a teenager, including the University of Wisconsin's jazz ensemble (although he never actually went to college). After first trying out for the Hal Kemp Orchestra and being rejected he joined the band in late 1929. His first recorded trumpet solos were with the orchestra, which toured England and a few other European countries in 1930. He also appeared as featured soloist with bands fronted by Rudy Vallee, Tommy Dorsey, Abe Lyman, Paul Whiteman and Benny Goodman.

Shortly after the Kemp orchestra returned to the U.S. in late 1930, Berigan, like fellow trumpeter Mannie Klein, the Dorsey Brothers and Artie Shaw, became a sought-after studio musician in New York. Fred Rich, Freddy Martin and Ben Selvin sought his services for record dates. He joined the staff of CBS radio network musicians in early 1931. Berigan recorded his first vocal, "At Your Command", with Rich that year. From late 1932 through early 1934, Berigan was a member of Paul Whiteman's orchestra, before playing with Abe Lyman's band briefly in 1934.

He returned to freelancing in the New York recording studios and working on staff at CBS radio in 1934. He recorded as a sideman on hundreds of commercial records, most notably with the Dorsey Brothers and on Glenn Miller's earliest recording as a leader in 1935, playing on "Solo Hop". At the same time, Berigan joined Benny Goodman's Swing Band. Jazz talent scout and producer John H. Hammond, who also became Goodman's brother-in-law, later wrote that he helped persuade Gene Krupa to re-join Goodman, with whom he had had an earlier falling-out, by mentioning that Berigan, whom Krupa admired, was already committed to the new ensemble. With Berigan and Krupa both on board, the Goodman band made the tour that ended at the Palomar Ballroom in Los Angeles, the performance often credited with the launch of the swing era.  Berigan recorded a number of solos while with Goodman, including "King Porter Stomp", "Sometimes I'm Happy", and "Blue Skies".

Fame
Berigan left Goodman to return again to freelancing as a recording and radio musician in Manhattan. During this time (late 1935 and throughout 1936), he began to record regularly under his own name, and he continued to back singers such as Bing Crosby, Mildred Bailey, and Billie Holiday. He spent some time with Tommy Dorsey's orchestra in late 1936 and early 1937, working as a jazz soloist on Dorsey's radio program and on several records. His solo on the Dorsey hit recording "Marie" became one of his signature performances. In 1937, Berigan assembled a band to record and tour under his name, picking the then-little known Ira Gershwin–Vernon Duke composition "I Can't Get Started" as his theme song. He made three attempts to organize a band of his own, his last try meeting success, playing trumpet in nearly every number while directing the band. Berigan's trumpet work and vocal made his recorded performance of it for Victor the biggest hit of his career. Berigan modeled his trumpet style in part on Louis Armstrong's, and he often acknowledged Armstrong as his idol. Still, his trumpet sound and jazz ideas were unique, earning Armstrong's praise both before and after Berigan's death.

Bandleader
Berigan led his own band full-time from early 1937 until June 1942, with a six-month hiatus in 1940 as a sideman in Tommy Dorsey's band. A series of misfortunes and Berigan's alcoholism worked against his financial success as a bandleader. Berigan also began an affair with singer Lee Wiley in 1936, which lasted into 1940. The stresses of bandleading drove Berigan to drink even more heavily. Among the players who worked in the Berigan band were: drummers Buddy Rich, Dave Tough, George Wettling, Johnny Blowers and Jack Sperling; alto saxophonists and clarinetists Gus Bivona, Joe Dixon and Andy Fitzgerald; vocalists Danny Richards, Ruth Bradley and Kathleen Lane; pianist Joe Bushkin; trombonist and arranger Ray Conniff; trombonist Sonny Lee; bassists Hank Wayland and Morty Stulmaker; trumpeters Carl Warwick, Steve Lipkins and Les Elgart; tenor saxophonists Georgie Auld and Don Lodice; and pianist and arranger Joe Lipman.

Berigan was regularly featured on CBS Radio's Saturday Night Swing Club broadcasts from 1936 into 1937. This network radio show helped further popularize jazz as the swing era reached its peak. For the balance of the 1930s, he sometimes appeared on this program as a guest.

In the late 1930s, Berigan's drinking and consequent health problems may have contributed to his band's chronic financial and booking difficulties.

Final years and death
Berigan's business troubles drove him to declare bankruptcy in 1939, and shortly after to join Tommy Dorsey as a featured jazz soloist. By September 1940, Berigan briefly led a new small group, but soon reorganized a touring big band. Berigan led moderately successful big bands from the fall of 1940 into early 1942, and was on the comeback trail when his health declined alarmingly. On April 20, 1942, while on tour, Berigan was hospitalized with pneumonia in Allegheny General Hospital Pittsburgh, Pennsylvania, until May 8. His doctors discovered that cirrhosis had severely damaged his liver. He was advised to stop drinking and stop playing the trumpet for an undetermined length of time. Berigan did not do either. He returned to his band on tour and played for a few weeks before he returned to the Van Cortlandt Hotel, on 49th Street, where he made his home in New York City and suffered a massive hemorrhage on May 31, 1942. He died two days later in Stuyvesant Polyclinic Hospital, New York, at age 33. Funeral services were conducted June 3 at Saint Malachy's Roman Catholic Church in New York. He was buried in St. Mary's Cemetery south of Fox Lake.

Legacy
In compliance with Berigan's wish, the band was kept intact under his name. Donna Berigan, his widow, maintained his financial interest in it. Tenor sax player Vido Musso became the leader.

In 1944, Victor Records released a compilation of Berigan's recordings as bandleader.

His 1937 recording of "I Can't Get Started" was used in the film Save the Tiger (1973), the Roman Polanski film Chinatown (1974), and a Martin Scorsese short film, The Big Shave (1967). Woody Allen has used Berigan's music occasionally in his films. In 2010, his Victor recording of "Heigh-Ho" was used on a Gap Inc. clothing TV commercial. Berigan's name has been used frequently in the comic strip Crankshaft.

Starting in 1974, Fox Lake, Wisconsin held an annual Bunny Berigan Jazz Jubilee originally organized by Berigan's daughter, Joyce Hansen, until she was incapacitated by Alzheimer's disease, and then by Julie Fleming. The final Jubilee was held in 2018. Most of Berigan's recordings are available, and two full-length biographies of him have been published.

Top compositions
Berigan's top compositions include "Chicken and waffles", released as Decca 18117 in 1935 as by Bunny's Blue Boys, and "Blues", released in 1935 as Decca 18116, also with the Blue Boys. (This 1935 session was produced by John H. Hammond at Decca for issue in the UK on Parlophone. The Decca releases were part of a four-pocket album set issued in the 1940s during the 1942–44 musicians' strike.)

Honors
In 1975, Berigan's 1937 recording "I Can't Get Started" on Victor (25728-A) was inducted into the Grammy Hall of Fame. Berigan was inducted in the ASCAP Jazz Wall of Fame in 2008.

Personal life
Bunny's youngest daughter, Joyce "Jo," was born on April 22, 1936, and died on July 4, 2011. Her older sister, Patricia, was born in New York City on July 23, 1932, and died on December 8, 1998.

References

Further reading
 Mr. Trumpet...the Trials, Tribulations and Triumph of Bunny Berigan, by Michael P. Zirpolo, Scarecrow Press (2011).
 Bunny Berigan...Elusive Legend of Jazz, by Robert Dupuis, Louisiana State University Press, (1993).

External links
Bunny Berigan, Fox Lake's Own, historical materials from the University of Wisconsin Digital Collections

 Bunny Berigan Orchestra recordings at the Discography of American Historical Recordings.
Richard M. Sudhalter- The Complete Brunswick, Parlophone and Vocalion Bunny Berigan Sessions (Mosaic Records)

1908 births
1942 deaths
Swing trumpeters
Swing singers
Swing bandleaders
American jazz trumpeters
American male trumpeters
American jazz singers
American jazz bandleaders
Big band bandleaders
RCA Victor artists
Vocalion Records artists
People from Calumet County, Wisconsin
People from Fox Lake, Wisconsin
Singers from Wisconsin
Benny Goodman Orchestra members
20th-century American singers
20th-century trumpeters
20th-century American male musicians
American male jazz musicians
The Dorsey Brothers members
Biograph Records artists
Glenn Miller Orchestra members